Mueang Surat Thani, or colloquially Ban Don District (Thai/Southern Thai: บ้านดอน), is the capital district (amphoe mueang) of Surat Thani province in southern Thailand.

Geography
The district is at the mouth of the Tapi River, where it flows into Bandon Bay of the Gulf of Thailand. Neighboring districts are (from the east clockwise): Kanchanadit, Ban Na San, Ban Na Doem, and Phunphin district.

To the east of the district the Thathong River marks the natural boundary to Kanchanadit, while the boundary to Phunphin is partially marked by the western arm of the Tapi River. Khun Thale is a small lake in the center of the district. The Khao Tha Phet non-hunting area protects 4.65 km2 of a hill south of the city of Surat Thani.

The Khun Thale swamp to the south of the district is the source of two short minor rivers which meander through the city, Khlong Makham Tia and Khlong Tha Kup.

History
The district was formed when in 1897 Mueang Chaiya and Kanchanadit were merged into a single province named Chaiya, with its administrative center at Ban Don. The district was then named Mueang. In 1915 the province was renamed Surat Thani. In 1917 the district was renamed Ban Don (บ้านดอน). In 1938 the district was renamed Mueang Surat Thani, when all capital districts were named after their corresponding province.

Mueang Surat Thani or Ban Don before World War II period was the location of many businesses lined along the Tapi River, such as sawmills, trade offices, office of East Asiatic Company, including water bus services, which was often called Ruea Naris (เรือนริศ) and the residence of Prince Naris as well.

In before King Rama V's reign, Ban Don was also the center of shipbuilding as well. There are skilled shipbuilders in both domestic and neighbor districts, such as Thathong, Kanchanadit, Chaiya. They can build ships, both warships and royal barges.

Demographics

Though the primary language of Surat Thani Province is the Southern Thai language, Mueang Surat Thani District is an ethnic enclave which is locally dominated by Hoklo and Teochews, who mostly migrated from Penang and Bangkok after the Anglo-Siamese Treaty of 1909. It is therefore the sole district in the province where the Bandon dialect is the primary native language. Most of the locals are also fluent in Southern Thai language as a secondary language.

Administration

The district is divided into 11 sub-districts (tambons), which are further subdivided into 70 villages (mubans). Surat Thani itself is a city (thesaban nakhon) and covers tambons Talat and Bang Kung, and parts of the tambons Khlong Chanak, Bang Chana, Bang Bai Mai, and Makham Tia.  and  have sub-district municipality (thesaban tambon) status, and cover the same-named sub-district. There are a further eight tambon administrative organizations (TAO), for each sub-district except the three completely covered by municipalities.

References

External links
amphoe.com

Surat Thani
Mueang Surat Thani